The 1972 Penn State Nittany Lions represented Pennsylvania State University in the 1972 NCAA University Division football season. As a result of using ineligible players, the Oklahoma Sooners were ordered to forfeit seven wins from their 1972 season, including their on-field win over the Nittany Lions. However, Paterno and Penn State refused to accept the forfeit, and the bowl game is officially recorded as a loss.

Schedule

Roster

Rankings

Post season

NFL Draft
Five Nittany Lions were drafted in the 1973 NFL Draft.

Awards
 Joe Paterno
Walter Camp Coach of the Year

References

Penn State
Penn State Nittany Lions football seasons
Lambert-Meadowlands Trophy seasons
Penn State Nittany Lions football